The Hive is an original Star Wars novella written by Steven Barnes. It is set during the timeline of the prequel trilogy, approximately 21 years before Star Wars Episode IV: A New Hope.

Summary
The Hive follows the story of Obi-Wan Kenobi as he is dispatched as a Republic envoy to the Outer Rim planet Ord Cestus, where he must halt the sale of potentially deadly "bio-droids" to the Separatists. Despite Obi-Wan's efforts, this mission quickly turns from diplomatic to dangerous. This planet, which was at one time self-contained, has long since been co-opted by unscrupulous offworlders, whose plunder of a vital natural resource has enabled the rise of a powerful corporation that controls the economy. Even the native population known as the X’Ting have been reduced to mere second class citizens in their own society.

Obi-Wan brings with him the knowledge of a legal technicality that would allow the X'Ting to retake control of their planet. Circumstances within the X'Ting civilization are less than desirable in which to mount such a revival. This once tightly knit race has splintered into battling factions as a result of a devastating plague, which wiped out many of the X'Ting rulers. Reunification can only come with the rise of new royals, whom all X’Ting are bound by blood to serve. The eggs that will spawn those sovereigns lie out of reach, however, secured in a secret chamber and booby-trapped by those whose knowledge died with them in the plague. Obi-Wan and his X'Ting guide, Jesson Di Blinth, travel down into the sealed egg chamber in an attempt to retrieve the last remaining royal eggs. They face many trials along the way, including a question and answer session for the final test. The questions are presented by a machine that holds the eggs, and threatens vaporization of them if answered incorrectly. Jesson is the only one who can complete this task because he is X'Ting, and the test seeks to determine one's knowledge of X'Ting history.

Reception
On Goodreads, this book is 3.75/5, based on 675 ratings

See also

The Cestus Deception
Clone Wars (Star Wars)

References

External links
 Random House, Inc Listing
 Official CargoBay Listing

2004 novels
2004 science fiction novels
Star Wars Legends novels
Del Rey books